The Western Champion was a weekly English language newspaper published in Parkes, New South Wales, Australia.

History

The town of Parkes had been served with many newspapers.  The Western Champion began in 1893 and was published by M. J. Little.  The editor in the late 1890s was Gordon Tidy.  

After 33 years as the proprietor, William Giles also acquired the Parkes Post by September 1932.  Working from their separate offices, the Champion would publish on a Friday, and the Post on the Tuesday.  It ceased in 1934 and merged with the Champion Post to form the Parkes Post. The paper consisted mainly of advertising and news columns once a month.

Today the newspaper operates as the Parkes Champion-Post.

Digitisation

The various versions of the paper have been digitised as part of the Australian Newspapers Digitisation Program project hosted by the National Library of Australia.

See also

 List of newspapers in New South Wales
 List of newspapers in Australia

References

External links

 Parkes Champion-Post newspaper

Bibliography

Country conscience : a history of the New South Wales provincial press, 1841-1995 / by Rod Kirkpatrick, Canberra City, A.C.T. : Infinite Harvest Publishing, 2000
Looking good : the changing appearance of Australian newspapers / by Victor Isaacs, for the Australian Newspapers History Group, Middle Park, Qld. : Australian Newspaper History Group, 2007. 
Press timeline : Select chronology of significant Australian press events to 2011 / Compiled by Rod Kirkpatrick for the Australian Newspaper History Group 
Australian Newspaper History : A Bibliography / Compiled by Victor Isaacs, Rod Kirkpatrick and John Russell, Middle Park, Qld. : Australian Newspaper History Group, 2004.
Newspapers in Australian libraries : a union list. 4th ed.

Defunct newspapers published in New South Wales
Newspapers on Trove